Minuscule 206 (in the Gregory-Aland numbering), α 365 (Soden), is a Greek minuscule manuscript of the New Testament, partly on parchment, partly on paper (like codex 69). Palaeographically it has been assigned to the 15th century.

It has marginalia.

Formerly it was assigned by 214a and 270p. Scrivener labelled it by 182a.

Description 

The codex contains the text of the Acts of the Apostles, Pauline epistles, and Catholic epistles on 397 leaves (size ), with some lacunae (Acts 1:1-12:3; 13:5-15(?); 2 John-Jude). The text is written in 1 column per page, 20 lines per page. The order of books: Acts of the Apostles, Catholic epistles, and Pauline epistles.
It has some additional matter, like Journeys of Paul (as Minuscule 102, 216, 256, 468, 614, 665, 909, 912).

2 John, 3 John, and Epistle Jude were supplied in the 14th century.

Text 

The Greek text of the codex is a representative of the Caesarean text-type in the Catholic epistles and the Byzantine text-type in rest of the books of the codex. Aland placed it in Category III in the Catholic epistles, and in Category V in rest of books.

In the Pauline epistles text is close to the codices 429, 522, 1891, and 2815.

In 2 Timothy 2:14 it reads Χριστου (of Christ) for θεοῦ (of God) along with 429, 1758.

History 

The manuscript was brought by Carlyle from a Greek island to England (along with minuscule 470).

It was examined and described by Scrivener.

Formerly it was assigned by 214a and 270p. In 1908 C. R. Gregory gave number 206 for it.

Formerly it was housed at the Lambeth Palace. It is currently housed at the Antiquariat Christi (1182), in London.

See also 

 List of New Testament minuscules
 Biblical manuscript
 Textual criticism

References

Further reading 

  (as a)
 V. Davey, A Study of the New Testament Manuscripts 206 and 429 in the Pauline and Catholic Epistles, Unpublished M.A. Thesis, University of Birmingham, 1970.

External links 
 Minuscule 206 at the Encyclopedia of Textual Criticism

Greek New Testament minuscules
13th-century biblical manuscripts